Jaanus Uudmäe (born 24 December 1980) is an Estonian triple jumper and long jumper. His personal best in triple jump is 17.06m.

His father Jaak Uudmäe is a gold medalist in triple jump at the 1980 Summer Olympics in Moscow.

Achievements

References

1980 births
Living people
Estonian male triple jumpers
Estonian male long jumpers
Sportspeople from Tartu